Put3ska was a Filipino ska band formed in 1993. The band's name is word play, combining the Filipino phrase, putres ka ("damn you") and "ska". The band referred to itself as a "60s-oriented, 90s ska band, influenced by Jamaican and British ska".

History
Put3ska was officially launched in 1994.  The band released their first self-titled album eponymous Put3ska in 1994. The album carried the hit single Manila Girl, which earned the group a gold record award. That same year, the band was voted Best New Artist, Best Live Act and Myra Rauro voted Best Vocalist during the 1995 NU Rock Awards; the music video for Manila Girl was also nominated at the 1996 MTV Video Music Awards as Viewers' Choice For Asia.

The second album, Manila's Finest was released in 1996.  It featured original material, some in the Tagalog language, as well as a cover version of the classic ska hit My Boy Lollipop by Millie Small and a Northern Soul Classic Tainted Love by Gloria Jones.

In 1998 Myra Ruaro left the band and formed a new band The Brownbeat All Stars, she was replaced by Izel Serangelo and the band celebrate their 6th Anniversary at Music Museum on September 1, 2000

On May 24, 2019, the band returns with a reunion concert at Music Museum.

Former Put3ska band vocalist member Myra Rauro was guested in a segment of "Bawal Judgemental" in a longest running weekday variety program, "Eat Bulaga" aired on GMA Channel 7, also with fellow other band members, "Shamrock" vocalist Marc Tupaz, former Color It Red vocalist and now "Apartel" backing vocalist and now Artstart Band Vocalist Cookie Chua, former "Orange & Lemons" band vocalist & former "Kenyo" band vocalist & now comedian writer & occational actor McCoy Fundales, former "Freestyle" vocalist Jinky Vidal, and "True Faith" vocalist Medwin Marfil".

Discography

Studio albums
"Put3ska" (PolyEast Records, 1994)
"Manila's Finest" (PolyEast Records, 1998)

Singles
"Manila Girl" (Released in 1995 & Nominated As "International Viewers Choice For Asia", 1996 MTV Video Music Awards in New York)
"My Boy Lollipop" (Original by Millie Small, Released in 1998)

Awards

See also
Reggae
Ska

References

https://web.archive.org/web/20060325081018/http://www.philmusic.com/zine/news/1999/09/091699_put3ska/index.htm
https://pop.inquirer.net/74908/seminal-filipino-ska-band-put3ska-reunites-brings-all-under-one-groove

Filipino rock music groups
Musical groups from Manila
Musical groups established in 1993
Musical groups disestablished in 1998